Valentín Pimstein Weiner (August 9, 1925 – June 27, 2017) was a Chilean producer of telenovelas.

Biography 
Pimstein was the seventh child of nine in a Belarusian Jewish family (from Minsk), which owns a glass shop in Barrio Brasil in Santiago. His fondness for the romantic and melodramatic stories born under the eaves of his mother, a frequent consumer of Mexican films and soap operas, and developed in parallel with his interest in theater.

After fulfilling adulthood, Pimstein decided to leave his native country in search of adventure. He came to Mexico, where he became assistant director of a film studio assistant by day and a nightclub. There, he met Emilio Azcárraga Milmo, at that time owner of Telesistema Mexicano.

Pimstein died in Chile on June 27, 2017.

Filmography

Selected filmography

Film 
 Napoleoncito (1964)
 Bala perdida (1960)
 Vivir del cuento (1960) 
 Las tres pelonas (1958)
 The Living Idol (1957)

References

External links 
 

1925 births
2017 deaths
Chilean film producers
Chilean Jews
Chilean people of Belarusian-Jewish descent
People from Santiago
Chilean emigrants to Mexico